Geogarypidae is a family of pseudoscorpions, which contains the following genera:

 Afrogarypus

References 

 
Pseudoscorpion families